Bigg Boss 6 is the sixth season of the Indian Hindi-language reality TV show Bigg Boss, which is telecast on Colors TV. The season started from 7 October 2012 and ended on 12 January 2013. Salman Khan, who was the host of the previous two seasons, returned as the host for the show. The sixth season was launched as a Parivarik season with a Gujarati tagline- Alag che! (English: It's different).

The series was won by soap actress Urvashi Dholakia on 12 January 2013. Imam Siddiqui was the first runner up while Sana Khan and Niketan Madhok were second and third runners-up respectively.

Sana Khan returned as challenger to compete with champions in Bigg Boss Halla Bol!.

The final episode on 12 January had a 4.4 TVR (television rating points), becoming the highest-rated non-fiction show during the week. The finale also fared better than its previous season, which had dropped to 3.6 TVR. In the fourth season, the finale had rated a 6.7 TVR.  The show averaged 3.3 TVR in the week ended 12 January compared to 2.8 in the trailing week.

Production

House themes

Luxury house
The purpose built house is located at Lonavla, Maharashtra. It is designed by renowned art director Sabu Cyril. The house is built over an area of 15000 square feet. Featuring a more subtle and home-like feel with shades of red and white, it follows a completely different look from the previous year's house.

Rooms/Areas in the house include
 Confession room
 Captain's Quarters (the reward room)
 Living room
 Kitchen/Dining room
 The utility room
 Two separate bedrooms, along with storage shelves to store the housemates possessions
 One with Sunflower beds, wherein the petals act as beds, other with normal beds
 Bathroom
 Garden area which has a small pool with four white chairs placed next it

Twists

Not selected
In the grand premiere there was a twist where these more housemates came as commoners and the public had to vote which one of them will be selected to go inside. Kashif was selected while Divya and Rohin was rejected.

Secret village
The Padosi Ghar (Neighbour house) or the Secret village was revealed on Day 41, following the eviction of Aashka. Bigg Boss revealed that this year some evicted housemates and new entries will move to the village house where they will live for an undisclosed amount of time. Eventually, some of the housemates living in the village may return to the main house.
The house is built on grounds adjacent to the luxury house on a space only one-fourth of the size of the former. This rustic squatters' area has been designed by Leena Chanda. It is not equipped with amenities like air conditioning, microwave ovens, sink and swimming pool. 4 days after re-entering the village house Imam was relocated to the main house. 6 days after Imam was moved, the village was intruded by masked men who destroyed the house completely and abducted all five housemates in an attempt of move them to the main house via a tunnel.

Rooms/areas in the village include
 A small confession room
 Single bedroom consisting of 6 beds
 A well
 Couches have been replaced with chatayis for comfort on the floor
 A vintage television set which shows live feed from the main luxury house

Housemates status

Housemates
The participants in the order of appearance and entrance in the house are:

Original entrants
Navjot Singh Sidhu – Former Indian cricketer and Indian Member of Parliament from Amritsar (Lok Sabha constituency). He appeared as a judge on The Great Indian Laughter Challenge for all for its seasons and also acted in the serial Kyaa Hoga Nimmo Kaa which starred Sanjeeda Sheikh.
Sana Khan – Actress, model and dancer. Sana has appeared in many films like Dhan Dhana Dhan Goal (in item song Bilo Rani) and Halla Bol.
Vrajesh Hirjee – Actor. He is known for appearing in films such as Kaho Naa... Pyaar Hai, Tum Bin, Rehnaa Hai Terre Dil Mein, Kucch To Hai, Krishna Cottage, Fanaa, Golmaal, Salaam-E-Ishq, Heyy Babyy, Sunday and Golmaal Returns. He also appeared in the show Jassi Jaissi Koi Nahin.
Sampat Pal Devi – Social activist. She is the founder and leader of a group of women activists in India's northern Uttar Pradesh state's Banda District, called the "Gulabi Gang".
Urvashi Dholakia – Television actress. She is known for playing the role of Komolika in the show Kasautii Zindagii Kay.
Aashka Goradia – Television actress. She is known for her role of Kumud in the show Kkusum and later appeared in shows like Kyunki Saas Bhi Kabhi Bahu Thi, Kahiin to Hoga, Sinndoor Tere Naam Ka and Laagi Tujhse Lagan. She participated in Fear Factor: Khatron Ke Khiladi in 2011.
Dinesh Lal Yadav – Bhojpuri actor.
 Delnaaz Irani – Actress who separated from her marriage to fellow contestant Rajev Paul in 2010. She is known for playing the role of Sweety in Kal Ho Naa Ho. She also appeared in shows like Karam Apnaa Apnaa, Baa Bahoo Aur Baby and Kya Huaa Tera Vaada. She participated in the reality show Nach Baliye.
 Aseem Trivedi -- Cartoonist.
 Sapna Bhavnani – Celebrity hairstylist.
 Rajeev Paul – Indian television and theatre actor and writer who split from his marriage to fellow contestant Delnaaz Irani in 2010. He is known for his role of Deven Garg in the Ekta Kapoor show Kahaani Ghar Ghar Kii. He later participated in Nach Baliye. 
 Sayantani Ghosh – Model, television and film actress. She is known for her role of Amrita in the Zee TV show Naaginn. She also appeared in shows like Kumkum – Ek Pyara Sa Bandhan, Sabki Laadli Bebo, Geet – Hui Sabse Parayi and Mrs. Kaushik Ki Paanch Bahuein.
 Niketan Madhok – Model. 
 Karishma Kotak – Model. Karishma is a model born from London.
Kashif Qureshi – Non-celebrity martial arts trainer. He got selected to be the "Common Man" (non-celebrity) via auditions held across India.

Wild Card entrants
 Mink Brar – Model, actress and producer.
 Vishal Karwal – Television actor.
 Imam Siddique – Fashion stylist and reality television personality.
 Santosh Shukla – Actor.

Guest entrants
 Jyoti Amge - Actress. Holds the Guinness World Record for being the smallest woman living on Earth.
 Sanjeeda Sheikh -- Television actress who works in the Hindi television industry. She is one of the most famous actresses on Indian television.

Guest appearances
 Daler Mehndi, Mona Lisa, Himesh Reshammiya and Rani Mukherjee made appearances on the premier of the season to welcome housemates to the new house.
 On 13 October 2012, Producer/Director Karan Johar and Bollywood Actors Alia Bhatt, Varun Dhawan and Sidharth Malhotra appeared on the eviction interview night to promote their upcoming film Student of the Year.
 On 20 October 2012, Bollywood Actors Sanjay Dutt, Sonakshi Sinha and Ajay Devgn appeared on the eviction interview night to promote their upcoming film Son of Sardaar.
 On 27 October 2012, Bollywood Actress Preity Zinta appeared on the eviction interview night to promote her upcoming film and production Ishkq in Paris.
 On 3 November 2012, Bigg Boss 4 winner Shweta Tiwari and finalist Dolly Bindra appeared on the eviction interview night.
 On 10 November 2012, Producer/Director & Salman's brother Arbaaz Khan appeared on the eviction interview night to promote Khan's upcoming film Dabangg 2. Hip hop singer and rapper Hard Kaur also appeared on the same night.
 On 24 November 2012, Bigg Boss 1 contestant and item girl Rakhi Sawant entered the Village as a guest for a short amount of time.
 On 28 November 2012, Actress Anjana Das and Stand-up comedian Bharti Singh entered the house as part of a task for a short amount of time.
 On 30 November 2012, Kareena Kapoor to have the first look of her song Fevicol se in Dabangg 2.
On 1 December 2012, Yo Yo Honey Singh comes to promote Siftaan and Sudesh Lehri, Kapil Sharma, Bharti Singh, Aditya Narayan comes for the Enjoyment and Govinda and Sanjay dutt Comes for Salman Khan
 On 8 December 2012, Akshay kumar and Asin to promote their movie Khiladi 786.
 On 15 December 2012, Rashmi Desai appeared to flirt with Salman Khan.
 On 22 December 2012, Bipasha Basu appeared on the Eviction episode to promote her new fitness album "Break Free".
 On 29 December 2012, Anil Kapoor and Jacqueline Fernandez appeared on the eviction interview night to promote their movie Race 2.
 On 12 January 2013, Emraan Hashmi to promote his film Ek Thi Daayan. Prabhu Deva and Remo D'Souza to promote their film ABCD: Anybody Can Dance. Neha Dhupia, Tusshar Kapoor and comedians to promote their show "Nautanki". Yana Gupta to perform in the "Bigg Boss House". Asha Negi, Pooja Gaur, Rashami Desai and Rati Pandey to perform with Sampat Pal Devi on the "Bigg Boss" stage, Kapil Sharma for a comedy act. All of the evicted contestants also appeared for the Grand Finale.

Nominations table

Nomination notes

Ratings, Reception and Viewership
 The final episode on 12 January clocked a 4.4 TVR (television rating points), becoming the highest-rated non-fiction show during the week. The finale also fared better than its previous season, which had dropped to 3.6 TVR. In the fourth season, the finale had clocked a 6.7 TVR. The fall in the ratings last year had forced the channel to tweak the format a bit and make it more family-oriented. The show averaged 3.3 TVR in the week ended 12 January compared to 2.8 in the trailing week.

References

External links
 Official Website

2012 Indian television seasons
2013 Indian television seasons
06